AIA Group Limited, often known as AIA, is a Hong Kong-based multinational insurance and finance corporation. It is the largest publicly listed life insurance group in Asia-Pacific. It offers insurance and financial services, writing life insurance for individuals and businesses, as well as accident and health insurance, and offers retirement planning, and wealth management services, variable contracts, investments and securities.

AIA is headquartered in Central, Hong Kong, with a presence in 18 markets in Asia-Pacific, with wholly-owned branches and subsidiaries in Hong Kong, mainland China, Taiwan, Macau, South Korea, Singapore, Thailand, Malaysia, the Philippines, Indonesia, Vietnam, Brunei, Cambodia, Myanmar, Australia, New Zealand, Sri Lanka and a 49% joint venture in India. Since 2013, AIA has had an exclusive bancassurance agreement with Citibank that encompasses 11 AIA markets in Asia-Pacific.

In August 2013, AIA became the official shirt partner of the English Premier League football club Tottenham Hotspur. AIA's contract with Tottenham was renewed in May 2017 to extend through the 2021/22 Premier League season, and again in July 2019 to extend that date to the end of the 2026/27 season.

History 

AIA traces its roots to 19 December 1919 when Cornelius Vander Starr founded what was then known as American Asiatic Underwriters in Shanghai, China (later American International Underwriters). Starr eventually expanded his business throughout the world. On 21 January 1939, Starr relocated his head office from Shanghai to New York City after the Japanese invasion of China and again on 5 April 1949 with the communist takeover of mainland China, and the Chinese AIA became a subsidiary of New York-based American International Group (AIG).

On 4 December 2009, AIG sold preferred equity interests in two newly formed international life insurance subsidiaries, American International Assurance Company, Limited (AIA) and American Life Insurance Company (ALICO), to the Federal Reserve Bank of New York to reduce its debt by US$25 billion.

AIA had planned to be listed company in Hong Kong Stock Exchange and Securities and Futures Commission on 3 April 2010. However, on 2 March 2010, Prudential PLC, a UK-based financial services and securities company, announced that it would buy AIA for US$35.5 billion. The purchase later fell through, and AIA held an IPO in October 2010, raising approximately HK$159.08 billion (US$20.51 billion), the world's third largest IPO ever.

On 11 September 2012, AIA acquired a 92.3% stake in Sri Lankan insurer Aviva NDB Insurance from British insurer Aviva and Sri Lanka's National Development Bank (NDB). AIA also entered into an exclusive 20-year bancassurance agreement with NDB, one of Sri Lanka's largest financial conglomerates with a nationwide bank branch network.

On 7 October 2012, AIA acquired ING Group's Malaysian insurance subsidiaries for a cash consideration of €1.336 billion (US$1.73 billion).

On 21 December 2012, AIG sold all of its 13.69% shareholding in AIA.

Since 2 June 2013, AIA has had an exclusive bancassurance agreement with Citibank that encompasses 11 AIA markets in Asia-Pacific, namely Hong Kong, mainland China, South Korea, Singapore, Thailand, Malaysia, Indonesia, the Philippines, Vietnam, Australia, and India.

See also 
List of insurance companies in Hong Kong

References

External links 
 
 AIA Group Limited

Companies listed on the Hong Kong Stock Exchange
American International Assurance
Financial services companies established in 1919
2010 initial public offerings
Companies in the Hang Seng Index
Conglomerate companies of Hong Kong